John Rawnsley (born 14 December 1950) is an English actor and opera singer. He is a baritone and has sung in the San Diego Opera. He sang the title role of Figaro in the 1981 film adaptation of Rossini's The Barber of Seville, and also the title role of Verdi's Rigoletto in Jonathan Miller's famous  'Mafia' production at the English National Opera. Opera critics have offered positive reviews of his performances in Verdi's "Rigoletto". Anthony Tommasini of the New York Times has praised Rawnsley's performance in Rigoletto as "affecting".

He appeared as Nigel in the 2012 film Quartet.

Rawnsley married actress and singer  in 1979.

References

External links 
 
 
 

Living people
1950 births
20th-century English male actors
20th-century British male opera singers
English operatic baritones
English male stage actors
English male film actors
21st-century English male actors